Clinton is an unincorporated community in Phelps County, in the U.S. state of Missouri.

History
Variant names were "Clinton Bank" and "Clinton Mine".  The community was named after Jake Clinton, the proprietor of a local mine. The community once contained the Clinton Bank School, now defunct.

References

Unincorporated communities in Phelps County, Missouri
Unincorporated communities in Missouri